Arjan Pisha (born 18 January 1977) is an Albanian retired footballer.

Club career

2011-present
Pisha signed for KF Tirana on 2 July 2011 for his second stint at the club.

International career
Pisha earned his first international cap on 15 November 2003 in a friendly against Estonia, entering in the last six minutes as Albania won 2–0 at Qemal Stafa Stadium.

National team statistics

Honours
KF Elbasani
Albanian First Division: 2013-14

References

External links

1977 births
Living people
Footballers from Elbasan
Albanian footballers
Association football defenders
Albania international footballers
KF Elbasani players
FK Dinamo Tirana players
KF Tirana players
Kategoria Superiore players
Kategoria e Parë players